Gay for Play Game Show Starring RuPaul is an American game show that premiered on the Logo cable network, on April 11, 2016 and ended on July 13, 2017. The trivia-based game show, hosted by RuPaul, featured contestants who answer questions related to pop culture with an option of asking the celebrity panel for help. The panel includes Michelle Visage, Todrick Hall, Carson Kressley, and Ross Mathews, as well as a rotating panel of former contestants of RuPaul's Drag Race and various other celebrities.

Development and production
On January 21, 2016, Gay for Play Game Show Starring RuPaul was greenlit by Logo, which described the series as a "celebrity-filled pop culture trivia show." The trailer for the series was revealed on March 3, 2016. The trailer featured footage of many celebrity guests, although several of them were not featured on the first 6 episodes. The series premiered on April 11, 2016. On May 26, 2016, it was announced that Gay for Play Game Show Starring RuPaul would return with more episodes, and a second season of 6 episodes began airing on June 29, 2017.

Episodes

Season 1 (2016)

Season 2 (2017)

References

External links

 
 
 

2016 American television series debuts
2010s American game shows
2010s American LGBT-related television series
Works by RuPaul
English-language television shows
Logo TV original programming
Television series by World of Wonder (company)
American LGBT-related reality television series